Jostein Ekeland (born 24 July 1997) is a Norwegian footballer who plays as a forward for Strømsgodset.

Career
On 2 April 2019, Ekeland signed a one-year contract with Eliteserien club Viking FK. On 18 December 2019, he signed a three-year contract with 1. divisjon club Sandnes Ulf.

Career statistics

Honours
Viking
 Norwegian Football Cup: 2019

References

1997 births
Living people
Sportspeople from Stavanger
Norwegian footballers
FK Vidar players
Viking FK players
Sandnes Ulf players
Strømsgodset Toppfotball players
Norwegian Third Division players
Norwegian Second Division players
Norwegian First Division players
Eliteserien players
Association football forwards